Damion Lewis (born January 3, 1995) is an American goalkeeper.

Career

Youth and College Career 
Lewis played for Kendall Soccer Academy while he was growing up. He played collegiately at Cal State Northridge and Chico State where he made 61 saves. Lewis won the Wildcat of the Week, during this time span Lewis played 3 games.

Pro career 
Lewis signed to play for Reno 1868.

References 

1995 births
Living people
American soccer players
People from Miami
Reno 1868 FC players
Association football goalkeepers
Soccer players from Florida
Cal State Northridge Matadors men's soccer players
Chico State Wildcats men's soccer players